The 2016 TCR International Series Buriram round was the eighth round of the 2016 TCR International Series season. It took place on 27–28 August at the Chang International Circuit.

Pepe Oriola won the first race, starting from pole position and James Nash gained the second one, both driving a SEAT León TCR.

Ballast
Due to the results obtained in the previous round, Stefano Comini received +30 kg, Mikhail Grachev +20 kg and Jean-Karl Vernay +10 kg.

Classification

Qualifying

 — Chen Jian Hong and Munkong Sathienthirakul were moved to the back of the grid for having not set a time within the 107% limit.

Race 1

Race 2

Notes
 — Jack Lemvard was sent to the back of the grid for Race 2, for having broken parc fermé rules.
 — Jack Lemvard and Munkong Sathienthirakul was given a 30-second penalty each for overtaking Rafaël Galiana under yellow flag conditions.

Standings after the event

Drivers' Championship standings

Model of the Year standings

Teams' Championship standings

 Note: Only the top five positions are included for both sets of drivers' standings.

References

External links
TCR International Series official website

Buriram
TCR International
TCR